Tutti dentro, internationally released as Everybody in Jail, is a 1984 Italian comedy film written, starred and directed by Alberto Sordi. The main character, a hyperactive, vain and logorrheic judge, is referred as one of the most famous fictional judges in the Italian collective imagination.

Plot
The judge Annibale Salvemini is an incorruptible magistrate of Rome which, although close to retirement, does not intend to show any sign of weakness. He continues his severe work and continues feeding without pity all the poor people that comes within range, including of course the criminals. All his colleagues admire him, including his girlfriend with whom he is to marry. But also an honest judge and moralist like Annibale has secrets. In fact he, in addition to his life full of lies and worldliness, has entered into an agreement with an American mafia boss: Corrado Parisi. In fact, Annibale was forced against his will to accept the assignment to not send to jail the whole company of the boss, who is preparing a shady traffic. Annibale eventually tries to rebel, but can not make it in time for the television journalists discover it. Comments are added to the scandal of the best friends of Annibale and his esteemed colleagues of the court immediately condemn him as the worst of all parasites. The life of Annibale is destroyed in one fell swoop.

Cast
 Alberto Sordi as Annibale Salvemini
 Joe Pesci as Corrado Parisi
 Dalila Di Lazzaro as Iris Del Monte
 Giorgia Moll as Giovanna Salvemini
 Armando Francioli as Enrico Patellaro
 Tino Bianchi as Counsilor Vanzetti
 Franco Scandurra as General attorney
 Marisa Solinas as Luisella

References

External links

Everybody in Jail at Variety Distribution

1984 films
Italian comedy films
Films directed by Alberto Sordi
1984 comedy films
Films about miscarriage of justice
Films scored by Piero Piccioni
1980s Italian-language films
1980s Italian films